Liparis brashnikovi is a fish from the genus Liparis. The fish grows to a maximum of 15 cm (in total length). It is a marine fish that lives in the demersal zone. Distribution includes the Sea of Japan in the Northwest Pacific Ocean.

References

Liparis (fish)
Taxa named by Vladimir Soldatov
Fish described in 1930
Fish of the North Pacific